Louis dressing is a salad dressing based on mayonnaise, to which red chili sauce, minced green onions, and minced green chili peppers have been added.  It is commonly used as a dressing for salads featuring seafood, such as a crab (Crab Louis, the King of Salads) or shrimp (Shrimp Louis).

Origin
The origin of the dressing is disputed. The Olympic Club in Seattle, The Davenport Hotel in Spokane, Washington, Solari's Restaurant, Bergez-Frank's Old Poodle Dog Restaurant and the St. Francis Hotel in San Francisco, and the Bohemian in Portland all claim to be the home of the dressing, with the invention in either the 1900s or 1910s. In all cases, the original salad was made with Dungeness crab.

From The American Heritage Cookbook published 1964:

 1 cup mayonnaise,
 1/4 cup chili sauce,
 2 Tbsp finely diced or grated onion,
 2 Tbsp fresh parsley, chopped fine,
 A pinch or two of cayenne,
 1/2 cup heavy cream, whipped

The first five ingredients are combined and the whipped cream folded in.

References

External links

History of Salads and Salad Dressings
The Davenport Hotel

Salad dressings
Sauces
Mayonnaise